Nerve Radio is the Student Union run radio station for Bournemouth University.  It was started in 1995 by two Bournemouth University students David Harber and James Bromley in a portacabin on the University's Talbot Campus, and now operates online through its website. During each academic year, Nerve Radio broadcasts on a temporary FM licence around the Bournemouth area, usually at the end of the Spring term in March.

Nerve Radio broadcasts every day during term time. Live programming runs from 9am until 10pm, with general shows during the day and specialist programming in the evening. During FM broadcasts, live programming usually starts earlier.

Nerve Radio is part of Nerve Media, which regularly posts news articles and online features on their website, alongside publishing the award winning Nerve Magazine.

In 2015, Nerve Radio moved into the new Student Union building on campus. Nerve now operates with two fully equipped studios, and broadcasts to the hundreds of students inside the Student Union building.

Many alumni of the station have gone on to work in the industry professionally including Rachel Jones, Drew Miller Hyndman, and Fleur Ostojak. A number have joined BFBS including Alex Gill, Elliot Darby, and Jess Bracey.

References

External links 
 Nerve* Radio

Student radio in the United Kingdom
Radio stations established in 1995
Radio stations in Dorset
Bournemouth University